Alane Ferguson (born 1957) is an American author. She won the Edgar Award for Best Young Adult Mystery novel in 1990 for Show Me the Evidence.

Ferguson was born in Cumberland, Maryland, in 1957. Her mother is children's author Gloria Skurzynski. Ferguson collaborated with her mother on a series of novels titled Mysteries in Our National Parks for the National Geographic Society.

Ferguson is the author of many novels and mysteries, including the Edgar Award-winning Show Me The Evidence. She does intensive research for her books by attending autopsies and interviewing forensic pathologists.

Works
The Dying Breath, September 2009
Circle Of Blood, Viking, 2007 hardcover, 2007
Angel of Death, Viking, 2006 hardcover, 2006
The Christopher Killer, Viking, 2006 hardcover, 2006
Buried Alive, National Geographic, 2003 paperback, 2003
Escape from Fear, National Geographic, 2002 paperback, 2002
Out of the Deep, National Geographic, 2002 paperback, 2002
Running Scared, National Geographic, 2002 paperback. 2002
Over the Edge, National Geographic, 2001 paperback, 2001
Valley of Death, National Geographic, 2001 paperback, 2001
Ghost Horses, National Geographic, 2000 paperback, 2001
The Hunted, National Geographic, 2000 paperback, 2001
Deadly Waters, National Geographic, 1999 paperback, 2001
Cliff-Hanger, National Geographic, 1999 paperback, 2001
Rage of Fire, National Geographic, 1998 paperback, 2001
Wolf Stalker, National Geographic, 1997 paperback, 2001
The Mystery of the Fire in the Sky, Troll Associates|Troll Books, 1997

The Mystery of the Vanishing Creatures, Troll Books, 1996
The Mystery of the Spooky Shadow, Troll Books, 1996
Secrets, Simon & Schuster, 1997
Night Terrors, an anthology, 1996
See You in September, Avon Books, 1995
A Tumbleweed Christmas, Bradbury Press, 1995
Poison, Bradbury Press, 1994
Stardust, Bradbury Press, 1993
Overkill, Bradbury Press, 1992
The Practical Joke War, Bradbury Press, 1991
Cricket and the Crackerbox Kid, Bradbury Press, 1990
Show Me the Evidence, Bradbury Press, 1989
That New Pet, Lothrop Lee & Shephard, 1987

References

External links

 The Gloria Skurzynski Papers

Living people
1957 births
American women writers
Edgar Award winners
People from Cumberland, Maryland
21st-century American women